Peter Green and Friends was the name of a touring band of musicians led by Fleetwood Mac founder, singer and guitarist Peter Green.

History
The group was formed in 2009, after Green had been out of the limelight for several years, having previously toured with the Peter Green Splinter Group. They toured the UK and Europe in 2009. The band were supported by Andrew Maxwell Morris during some of their tour dates.

Band lineup
Peter Green (lead guitar, vocals)
Mike Dodd (rhythm guitar, vocals)
Geraint Watkins (keyboards)
Matt Radford (bass)
Andrew Flude (drums)
Martin Winning (tenor sax)

References

British blues musical groups